Blair Lancaster is a Canadian businesswoman and politician from Burlington, Ontario. A winner of the Miss Canada pageant in 1974, she subsequently operated her own spa business in Burlington.

Lancaster was a member of the Burlington City Council from 2010 to 2018 serving two terms for Ward 6.

References

Miss Canada winners
Burlington, Ontario city councillors
Politicians from Hamilton, Ontario
Living people
1954 births
Women municipal councillors in Canada